Clint Gosling (born 1 May 1960) is a former association football goalkeeper who represented New Zealand at international level.

Raised in Auckland, Gosling played his junior football at Lynndale AFC, which later merged with Avondale United to become Lynn-Avon United, and represented Auckland and New Zealand at various junior age group levels.

His senior career began with Eastern Suburbs and Mount Wellington before he moved to Australia to join Newcastle KB UnitedNewcastle Rosebud and later Sydney Olympic in the Australian National Soccer League

Gosling made his full New Zealand début in a 1–1 draw with Fiji on 20 October 1984. He played a total of 66 times for his country including unofficial matches, 39 or which were A-internationals. Gosling gained his final cap in a 0–3 loss to Australia on 6 June 1993.

Following his playing career, Gosling remained at Newcastle United Jets as goalkeeping coach until being dismissed by the club in November 2011. He continues as goalkeeping coach on a part-time basis for the New Zealand national teams at all levels.

References

External links 

1960 births
Living people
New Zealand association footballers
New Zealand international footballers
Association football goalkeepers
National Soccer League (Australia) players
Sydney Olympic FC players
Newcastle Jets FC managers
Parramatta FC players
New Zealand association football coaches